El Walamo is a locality in the municipality of Mazatlán, Sinaloa, Mexico. It is located 25 kilometers south of the city of Mazatlán.

References

Populated places in Sinaloa